Chryselium is a genus of flowering plants belonging to the family Asteraceae. It contains a single species, Chryselium gnaphalioides.

Its native range is Western South America to Venezuela.

References

Gnaphalieae
Monotypic Asteraceae genera